The 1964–65 season was the Royals' 19th season in the NBA and eighth in Cincinnati. By the end of the season, Oscar Robertson's career statistics for the first five years of his career averaged out to a triple double: 30.3 points per game, 10.4 rebounds per game, and 10.6 assists per game.
The season began with high hopes as the Royals had played well the previous season against Boston and were improving as a team. In addition to Robertson, second-year big man Jerry Lucas rose to superstar status this season. He averaged 21 points and 20 rebounds over 66 games played. He joined Robertson on the All-NBA First Team named at the season's conclusion.
Injuries, though, were a big factor this season. Key guard Arlen Bockhorn was lost to a career-ending injury in November. The other four opening-day starters, Robertson, Lucas, Jack Twyman and Wayne Embry, were each lost for several games or more also.
Lucas was named MVP of the 1965 NBA All-Star Game. But the same day's events saw superstar Wilt Chamberlain traded to the rival Philadelphia 76ers. Now Cincinnati had two strong title contenders to deal with in their own division. Philadelphia later defeated the Royals in the 1965 playoffs.

Draft picks

Roster

Regular season

Season standings

Record vs. opponents

Game log

Playoffs

|- align="center" bgcolor="#ffcccc"
| 1
| March 24
| Philadelphia
| L 117–119 (OT)
| Jack Twyman (25)
| Jerry Lucas (27)
| Oscar Robertson (13)
| Cincinnati Gardens6,422
| 0–1
|- align="center" bgcolor="#ccffcc"
| 2
| March 26
| @ Philadelphia
| W 121–120
| Oscar Robertson (40)
| Jerry Lucas (21)
| Oscar Robertson (13)
| Municipal Auditorium5,801
| 1–1
|- align="center" bgcolor="#ffcccc"
| 3
| March 28
| Philadelphia
| L 94–108
| Oscar Robertson (27)
| Jerry Lucas (17)
| Oscar Robertson (12)
| Cincinnati Gardens6,289
| 1–2
|- align="center" bgcolor="#ffcccc"
| 4
| March 31
| @ Philadelphia
| L 112–119
| Jerry Lucas (35)
| Jerry Lucas (19)
| Oscar Robertson (10)
| Municipal Auditorium7,451
| 1–3
|-

Player Statistics

Regular season

Playoffs

Awards and honors
 Oscar Robertson, All-NBA First Team
 Jerry Lucas, All-NBA First Team

References

External links
 1964–65 Royals on Basketball Reference

Sacramento Kings seasons
Cincinnati
Cincinnati
Cincinnati